Wyszyński (feminine: Wyszyńska; plural: Wyszyńscy) is a noble Polish family name (coat of arms: Pierzchała, Sas, Trzywdar). It has 7–8 thousand bearers. Its nest is okolica szlachecka (zaścianek) Wyszonki in Podlasie. It corresponds to the Lithuanian Višinskis and Russian Vyshinsky and may be Anglicized as Wyshynski.

The surname  may refer to:

 Stefan Wyszyński (1901–1981), Polish cardinal
 Marek Wyszyński, Polish business executive

See also
 
 

Polish-language surnames